Luíza Ávila Carvalho also written as Luisa Carvalho (born 2 July 1983) is a female water polo player of Brazil.

She was part of the Brazilian team at World Championships, most recently at the 2015 World Aquatics Championships. She won a bronze medal at the 2011 Pan American Games.

See also
 Brazil at the 2015 World Aquatics Championships

References

External links

http://thepioneeronline.com/23785/sports/csueb-womens-water-polo-falls-to-brazil/
http://www.gettyimages.com/photos/luiza-carvalho-water-polo-player?excludenudity=true&sort=mostpopular&mediatype=photography&phrase=luiza%20carvalho%20water%20polo%20player

Brazilian female water polo players
Living people
Place of birth missing (living people)
1983 births
Olympic water polo players of Brazil
Water polo players at the 2016 Summer Olympics
Pan American Games medalists in water polo
Pan American Games bronze medalists for Brazil
Water polo players at the 2011 Pan American Games
Water polo players at the 2015 Pan American Games
Medalists at the 2011 Pan American Games
Medalists at the 2015 Pan American Games